"The Tower of the Elephant" is one of the original short stories starring  the fictional sword and sorcery hero Conan the Cimmerian, written by American author Robert E. Howard. Set in the pseudo-historical Hyborian Age, it concerns Conan infiltrating a perilous tower to steal a fabled gem from an evil sorcerer named Yara. Its unique insights into the Hyborian world and atypical science fiction elements have led the story to be considered a classic of Conan lore and is often cited by Howard scholars as one of his best tales.

Plot summary
In the Zamorian city of Arenjun, also known as the "City of Thieves,” Conan drinks in a tavern. He overhears a Kothic rogue describe a fabulous jewel known as the "Heart of the Elephant," which is kept in a tower by an evil sorcerer named Yara.

Conan ventures into Yara's garden to steal the jewel and encounters Taurus of Nemedia, known as the "Prince of Thieves,” who has the same agenda. Taurus is wily and fat, but amazingly agile. Impressed by Conan's daring, Taurus agrees to work together. After battling lions in the tower gardens,  the thieves ascend Yara's spire. Upon reaching the top, Taurus enters a treasure vault and is killed by the venomous bite of a giant spider. Conan crushes the spider with a chest of gems, then continues his search for the Heart of the Elephant.

He discovers a strange being with the body of a man and the head of an elephant. The creature, Yag-kosha, is a blind and tortured prisoner of Yara.

Yag-kosha reveals to Conan the pre-cataclysmic saga of his people, their arrival on Earth, and how he taught Yara the art of magic only to have his apprentice betray him. At Yag-kosha's request, Conan grabs the fabled jewel, kills the being, extracts the heart from his corpse, and drips its blood over the Heart of the Elephant. When he sets the blood-infused relic in front of Yara in his sleeping-chamber, the gem's magic shrinks and draws the sorcerer into the jewel. Inside, a revived Yag-kosha, limbs and wings restored, pursues the screaming Yara, and the Heart vanishes.

Obeying Yag-kosha's instructions, Conan leaves, emerging empty-handed from the tower at dawn as it collapses behind him. He has nothing after his night's work except for his sword, loin-cloth, and sandals.

Publication history

Weird Tales magazine, March 1933
Skull-Face and Others (Arkham House, 1946)
The Coming of Conan (Gnome Press, 1953)
Conan (Lancer, 1967, later reissued by Ace Books)
The Tower of the Elephant (Donald M. Grant, Publisher, Inc., 1975)
The Conan Chronicles (Sphere Books, 1989)
The Conan Chronicles Volume 1: The People of the Black Circle (Gollancz, 2000)
Conan of Cimmeria: Volume One (1932-1933) (Del Rey, 2003)
Conan the Barbarian:  the Stories that Inspired the Movie (Del Rey, 2011)

Adaptations
An adventure is based on this tale for Conan: The Roleplaying Game.

The Tower of the Elephant has been adapted into comic three times: twice by Marvel and once by Dark Horse.

The first adaptation by Marvel appeared in Conan the Barbarian #4. The story was adapted by Roy Thomas and illustrated by Barry Windsor-Smith and Sal Buscema.

The second adaptation by Marvel appeared in the Savage Sword of Conan #24 and was again written by Roy Thomas but this time drawn by John Buscema and Alfredo Alcala.

The newest adaptation, in Dark Horse's Conan issues 20-22, was written by Kurt Busiek and illustrated by Cary Nord, Dave Stewart and Mike Kaluta. Two of these have recently appeared in collections released by Dark Horse: the Conan the Barbarian adaptation in The Conan Chronicles Volume 1: The Tower of the Elephant and other stories, and the Dark Horse adaptation in Conan Volume 3: The Tower of the Elephant and other stories.

Episode 3 of the animated series Conan the Adventurer is adapted from "Tower of the Elephant", although the character of Taurus is replaced with Jezmine who becomes an ongoing character in the series rather than dying.

A variant on this story has been added into the massively multiplayer online role-playing game Wizard101, a dungeon called the "Tower of the Helephant".  The thief Taurus is the only name that remains true to the original tale, however the parallels between the stories are evident to anyone that is familiar with the story. The players must scale a tower and descend into it, ultimately freeing the elephant-headed interstellar being by defeating the wizard that bound him and destroying the "Heart of the Helephant".

The story is the inspiration for a sequence in Conan the Barbarian, which includes Conan and his fellow thieves scaling a tower, battling a giant snake, and stealing a jewel.

In the 2011 film Conan the Barbarian a character extols Conan's past accomplishments and mentions his adventure in the Tower of the Elephant.

The story was adapted into a hack and slash video game for IOS by developer Chillingo, which was released as a tie-in for the 2011 film Conan the Barbarian.

Notes

External links

 The Tower of the Elephant at Project Gutenberg
 Conan the Barbarian at AmratheLion.com
 Conan.com: The Official Website

1933 short stories
Conan the Barbarian stories by Robert E. Howard
Cthulhu Mythos short stories
Fantasy short stories
Pulp stories
Works originally published in Weird Tales